This is a list of necropoleis sorted by country. Although the name is sometimes also used for some modern cemeteries, this list includes only ancient necropoleis, generally founded no later than approximately 1500 AD. Because almost every city in the ancient world had a necropolis, this list does not aim to be complete. It only lists the most notable necropoleis.

List of necropoleis by country

Algeria

 Jedars
 Nepasa
 Roknia

Austria
 Burgstallkogel

Bosnia and Herzegovina
 Radimlja
 Mramorje

Brazil
 Cemitério de São Francisco Xavier

Bulgaria
 Varna Necropolis

China
 Ming Dynasty Tombs
 Western Xia tombs
 Eastern Qing Tombs
 Western Qing Tombs

Colombia
 San Agustin Archaeological Park

Cyprus
 Tombs of the Kings

Egypt
 Abusir
 Bagawat
 Dahshur
 Giza Necropolis
 Qubbet el-Hawa
 Saqqara
 Siwa Oasis
 Theban Necropolis
 Umm el-Qa'ab
 Minya

France
 Alyscamps
 Civaux
 Père Lachaise Cemetery
 Necropolis of Bougon
 Pantheon

Germany
 Necropolis of Soderstorf
 Oldendorfer Totenstatt

Greece 
 Kerameikos
 Mycenae
 Vergina
 Amphipolis
 Marathon

Guatemala
 North Acropolis, Tikal

India 
 Qutb Shahi tombs
 Barid Shahi tombs

Iran
 Naqsh-e Rustam

Iraq
 Wadi-us-Salaam, reputedly the largest cemetery in the world.

Israel and the West Bank
 Beit She'arim
 Mount of Olives

Italy

 Cerveteri
 Gaudo culture necropolis
 Marzabotto 
 Necropolis of Monte Luna 
 Necropolis of Monterozzi
 Necropolis of Pantalica
 Norchia
 Tuvixeddu necropolis

Lebanon

 Royal necropolis of Byblos
 Tyre Necropolis

Libya
 Necropolis of Cyrene

Malta
 Hypogeum of Ħal-Saflieni

Morocco

 Chellah

North Macedonia
 Saint Erasmus

Pakistan

 Chaukundi
 Makli Hill

Peru
 Necropolis of Wari Kayan

Russia
 City of the Dead near Dargavs
 Kremlin Wall Necropolis

Somalia
 Hafun

Spain 
 El Maipes necropolis
 El Castillo - Palacios de la Sierra: Biggest in Europe

Syria
 Necropolis of Emesa
 Valley of Tombs

Turkey
 Bin Tepe
 Tombs of the kings of Pontus
 Karacaahmet Cemetery
 Eyüp Cemetery
 Hierapolis necropoleis
 Lycian necropoleis

Ukraine
 Caves of The Kyiv Pechersk Lavra

United States
 Colma, California

Uzbekistan
 Bahoutdin Architectural Complex

Vatican City
 Vatican Necropolis

References

necropoleis
Necropoleis